Chapalichthys is a genus of splitfins that are endemic to west-central Mexico, where found in lakes, pools, ponds and channels in the Lerma–Chapala–Grande de Santiago and Balsas basins. Despite this relatively small size, they are often caught as food in Lake Chapala.

Species
There are currently three species in this genus according to FishBase, but some authorities only recognize two, treating C. peraticus as a junior synonym of C. pardalis.

 Chapalichthys encaustus (D. S. Jordan & Snyder, 1899) (Barred splitfin)
 Chapalichthys pardalis Álvarez, 1963 (Polka-dot splitfin)
 Chapalichthys peraticus Álvarez, 1963 (Alien splitfin)

References

Goodeinae
Freshwater fish of Mexico
Endemic fish of Mexico
Freshwater fish genera
Taxa named by Seth Eugene Meek
Ray-finned fish genera